Clover Mount, also known as Tate House and Stone House Farm, is a historic home located near Greenville, Augusta County, Virginia. The house dates to the late-18th century and is a two-story, five-bay, cut limestone dwelling built in two stages and completed before 1803.  The original section contained a two-room, hall-parlor plan, and measured 30 feet by 20 feet.  Added to it was a single-cell, double-pile addition.  A two-story stuccoed ell was added to the house around 1900.  Also on the property is a contributing frame bank barn with heavy mortise-and-tenon construction.

It was listed on the National Register of Historic Places in 1982.

References

Houses on the National Register of Historic Places in Virginia
Houses completed in 1803
Houses in Augusta County, Virginia
National Register of Historic Places in Augusta County, Virginia
Stone houses in Virginia
1803 establishments in Virginia